The Korean Ladies Masters was a women's professional golf tournament co-sanctioned by the LPGA of Korea Tour and the Ladies European Tour. It was played from 2008 to 2010.

Winners

External links
Ladies European Tour

Former Ladies European Tour events
LPGA of Korea Tour events
Golf tournaments in South Korea
Recurring sporting events established in 2008
Recurring sporting events disestablished in 2010
Defunct sports competitions in South Korea